Bathurst East-Nepisiguit-Saint-Isidore is a provincial electoral district for the Legislative Assembly of New Brunswick, Canada.  It was first contested in the 2014 general election, and it was created in the 2013 redistribution of electoral boundaries, largely by combining the ridings of Nepisiguit and Centre-Péninsule-Saint-Sauveur with the eastern half of the electoral district of Bathurst, and a small section of Caraquet.

The district includes the city of Bathurst east of the Middle River, and several communities in the northwestern extremes of the Acadian Peninsula.

Members of the Legislative Assembly

Election results 

|-

|-

References 

Website of the Legislative Assembly of New Brunswick
Map of riding as of 2018

New Brunswick provincial electoral districts
Politics of Bathurst, New Brunswick